Gallup's List of People that Americans Most Widely Admired in the 20th Century is a poll published in December 1999 by The Gallup Organization to determine who around the world Americans admire most, in the 20th century.

Gallup has constructed a yearly Gallup's most admired man and woman poll list since 1948 but this poll cover the most notable figures of the entire century. They combined the results from the previous polls with a new preliminary poll to determine the 18 most admired people. The 1999 final poll produced an ordered list of 18 people, 12 of whom were males and 12 of whom were American citizens; the highest ranked non-American and non-male was (Saint) Mother Teresa, at #1. 

As of November 2022, at 76, Bill Clinton is the only surviving person on the list. Previously, Ronald Reagan, John Paul II, Margaret Thatcher, Nelson Mandela, and Billy Graham (the longest living person at 99) were all still living by the time the list was published, but they have since died.

List 
Source:

See also 
 Gallup's most admired man and woman poll

References 

Polling
Lists of celebrities
Top people lists